The A to Z of Babylon 5 is a book by David Bassom published by Boxtree.

Contents
The A to Z of Babylon 5 is a guide to Babylon 5, listing entries alphabetically from the first two seasons and beginning of the third season of the show.

Reception
Matt Bielby reviewed The A to Z of Babylon 5 for Arcane magazine, rating it a 6 out of 10 overall. Bielby comments that "It's ideal both for newcomers to the show and for referees developing scenarios for a GURPS-based Babylon 5-themed affair of their own, or for the official Babylon 5 game."

Reviews
Review by Neil Jones (1996) in Interzone, #110 August 1996

References

Babylon 5
Books about television
Encyclopedias of fictional worlds